Abdollah Chamangoli (born 22 September 1971) is an Iranian retired wrestler. He competed in the men's Greco-Roman 68 kg at the 1992 Summer Olympics.

References

External links
 

1971 births
Living people
Iranian male sport wrestlers
People from Saghez
Olympic wrestlers of Iran
Wrestlers at the 1992 Summer Olympics
Wrestlers at the 1986 Asian Games
Asian Games competitors for Iran
Asian Wrestling Championships medalists
20th-century Iranian people
21st-century Iranian people